At sea, a storm warning is a warning issued by the National Weather Service of the United States when winds between 48 knots (89 km/h, 55 mph) and 63 knots (117 km/h, 73 mph) are occurring or predicted to occur soon. The winds must not be associated with a tropical cyclone. If the winds are associated with a tropical cyclone, a tropical storm warning will be substituted for the storm warning and less severe gale warning. 

In US maritime warning flag systems, a red square flag with a black square taking up the middle ninth of the flag is used to indicate a storm warning (the use of two such flags denotes a hurricane force wind warning or a hurricane warning). The same flag as a storm warning is used to indicate a tropical storm warning.

On land, the National Weather Service issues a 'high wind warning' (Specific Area Message Encoding code: HWW) for storm-force winds, which also encompasses the lesser gale-force and greater hurricane force winds. In most cases, the warning applies to winds of 40-114 MPH for at least 1 hour; or any gusts of 58-114 miles per hour on land unless a tropical storm warning, blizzard warning, winter storm warning, severe thunderstorm warning, or dust storm warning covers the phenomenon. Winds in excess of 115 MPH (100 kt) will always result in new issuance of an extreme wind warning shortly before their onset, typically right before the eyewall of a major hurricane makes landfall, but possibly as a substitute for a severe thunderstorm warning in an extreme derecho event. The only exception is that if the extreme winds are associated with a tornado, a tornado warning (or more likely a tornado emergency) will be issued instead.

Weather Warning Flags (United States)

Example
The following is an example of a storm warning issued by the National Weather Service office in Seattle, Washington.

246 
WHUS76 KSEW 180451
MWWSEW

URGENT - MARINE WEATHER MESSAGE
NATIONAL WEATHER SERVICE SEATTLE WA
851 PM PST SUN JAN 17 2010

PZZ150-153-156-170-173-176-181300-
/O.UPG.KSEW.GL.W.0087.000000T0000Z-100118T2300Z/
/O.NEW.KSEW.SR.W.0003.100118T0451Z-100118T2000Z/
COASTAL WATERS FROM CAPE FLATTERY TO JAMES ISLAND OUT 10 NM-
COASTAL WATERS FROM JAMES ISLAND TO POINT GRENVILLE OUT 10 NM-
COASTAL WATERS FROM POINT GRENVILLE TO CAPE SHOALWATER OUT 10 NM-
COASTAL WATERS FROM CAPE FLATTERY TO JAMES ISLAND 10 TO 60 NM-
COASTAL WATERS FROM JAMES ISLAND TO POINT GRENVILLE 10 TO 60 NM-
COASTAL WATERS FROM POINT GRENVILLE TO CAPE SHOALWATER 10 TO
60 NM-
851 PM PST SUN JAN 17 2010

...STORM WARNING IN EFFECT UNTIL NOON PST MONDAY...

THE NATIONAL WEATHER SERVICE IN SEATTLE HAS ISSUED A STORM
WARNING...WHICH IS IN EFFECT UNTIL NOON PST MONDAY. THE GALE
WARNING IS NO LONGER IN EFFECT. 

PRECAUTIONARY/PREPAREDNESS ACTIONS...

A STORM WARNING MEANS WINDS OF 48 TO 63 KNOTS ARE IMMINENT OR
OCCURRING. RECREATIONAL BOATERS SHOULD REMAIN IN PORT OR TAKE
SHELTER UNTIL THE WINDS AND WAVES SUBSIDE. COMMERCIAL VESSELS
SHOULD PREPARE FOR VERY STRONG WINDS AND DANGEROUS SEA
CONDITIONS...AND CONSIDER REMAINING IN PORT OR TAKING SHELTER IN
PORT UNTIL WINDS AND WAVES SUBSIDE.

&&

$$

See also
 Severe weather terminology (United States)
 Small craft advisory
 Gale warning
 Hurricane warning

References

External links
 National Weather Service

Weather warnings and advisories